The Burger Boat Company, of Manitowoc, Wisconsin, US, is a builder of custom-designed, hand-built pleasure yachts. The company also produces commercial vessels.

Henry B. Burger founded the H. Burger Shipyard in 1863 in Manitowoc, WI. It produced its first welded steel yacht in 1938 and began using welded aluminum in 1952. Of the 500 yachts built in the company's history, there are about 250 still in service.

David Ross and partner Jim Ruffolo, Chicago entrepreneurs, acquired the bankrupt company in 1993. Ross retired in 2007. Burger is now headed by Jim Ruffolo, President/CEO.  About 350 employees build an average of three yachts a year.

Boats
Rhodes 77

Notes

References
Burger Boat Company
Building Burger's Biggest Part One: The Vision, Power & Motoryacht Magazine, By Kim Kavin
Building Burger's Biggest Part Two: The Construction, Power & Motoryacht Magazine, By Kim Kavin

Burger Boat Company